MOB kinase activator 1A is an enzyme that in humans is encoded by the MOB1A gene.

References

Further reading

External links 
 PDBe-KB provides an overview of all the structure information available in the PDB for Human MOB kinase activator 1A